The Terme River (rendered Thermodon) is a short river in Samsun Province, Turkey draining into the Black Sea. Its sources are in the Pontic Mountains. It runs through the fertile Çarşamba plain to Salıpazarı, where it splits into three tributaries. The city of Terme is on the river, about 5 km from its mouth.

The ancient name of the river is the Thermodon, and the surrounding region was the Pontus. In antiquity, its mouth was about "three plethra" wide (ca. 300 feet), and it was navigable. The river, said by Strabo to have "its many sources near Phanaroea... [in] many streams" (which is not true; perhaps he was thinking of the Iris), was "very often noticed by ancient writers", and its mouth was near the town of Themiscyra. Starting with Dionysius Periegetes, in his Periegesis of the World, the Thermodon is often confused with the Iris River (modern Yeşilırmak), which is much larger, flows through Phanaroea, and carries much more sediment.

In Greek mythology, the Thermodon was the location of the plain and capital, Themiscyra, where the Amazons dwelt.

References

Further reading
 Cited by Schmitz in the Thermodon article, op. cit.:
 Aeschyl. Prom. 274, Suppl. 290.
 Herodotus, 9.27.
 Herodotus, 4.86.
 Periplus of Pseudo-Scylax, p. 33.
 Strabo i. p.52, vii. p. 298.
 Periplus of the Euxine Sea p. 10.
 Ptolemy 5.6.4.
 Pomp. Mela, 1.19.
 Plin. Nat. H. 11.19, 37.37.
 Virgil Aeneid, 11.659.
 Ovid, ex Pont. 4.19 51.

See also 
 Themiscyra Plain

Rivers of Turkey
Landforms of Samsun Province
Landforms of Ordu Province